Ikk is a 2021 Indian Tamil-language action adventure film written and directed by Babu Tamizh (Jiivi'''s writer) in his directional debut and produced by Dharmraj Films. The film stars debutant Yogesh, Guru Somasundaram and Anicka Vikhraman with a supporting cast including Y. G. Mahendran and Aadukalam Naren. The film released in theatres on 10 December 2021.

 Cast 

 Yogesh as Vasanth Chandrasekhar
 Guru Somasundaram as Gnanaprakasam
 Anicka Vikhraman as Dhanya Vasanth
 Y. G. Mahendran
 Aadukalam Naren as Kanagavel Rajan

 Reception 
Bhuvanesh Chandar of Cinema Express gave a rating of 2 out on 5 and wrote, "Writing a story with an unreliable narrator isn't an easy feat, but it is effective only when it translates into an engaging watch. If only Ikk had turned into one, it would have been as unique as the title." Behindwoods'' gave a rating of 2.5 out on 5 and wrote, "Babu Tamizh's unique concept and writing makes Ikk an engaging watch."

References 

Indian action adventure films